Qir Kandi (also Romanized as Qīr Kandī) is a village in Zangebar Rural District, in the Central District of Poldasht County, West Azerbaijan Province, Iran. At the 2006 census, its population was 291, in 73 families.

References 

Populated places in Poldasht County